ZSM can stand for:

 ZSM-5 (Zeolite Socony Mobil 5), a zeolite used as a catalyst in oil refining
 Zoologische Staatssammlung München (Munich State Zoological Collection), a German zoological institute
 zsm, ISO 639-3 code for Standard Malay

Education
Zimbabwe School of Mines